Michael Henry Brown  (born 15 April 1936) is a New Zealand Anglican priest. After a range of clerical roles in Canterbury, he was Dean of Saint Paul's Cathedral, Wellington from 1985 to 2002.

Early life and family
Brown was born in Christchurch on 15 April 1936, the son of Catherine and Harry Brown, and educated at Christchurch Boys' High School. He saw military service with the Regiment of New Zealand Artillery between 1955 and 1958, before going on to study at the University of Canterbury, graduating Bachelor of Commerce in 1963, and qualifying as an associate chartered accountant the same year. He later gained a Master of Business Administration degree from Canterbury in 1991.

In 1965, Brown married Anne Elizabeth Pierre.

Priesthood
Brown completed study for the Licentiate of Theology and was ordained in 1964. After curacies in  Linwood and Ashburton he held incumbencies at Marchwiel, Burwood and Merivale. He was also Archdeacon of Rangiora.

He also continued his military involvement with the Royal New Zealand Chaplains Department between 1967 and 1984, and was awarded the Efficiency Decoration in 1983.

In 1990, Brown was awarded the New Zealand 1990 Commemoration Medal. In the 1999 Queen's Birthday Honours, he was appointed a Companion of the New Zealand Order of Merit, for services to the community.

References

1936 births
Living people
Religious leaders from Christchurch
People educated at Christchurch Boys' High School
New Zealand Army personnel
University of Canterbury alumni
Deans of Wellington
Archdeacons of Rangiora
Companions of the New Zealand Order of Merit